is the third physical single by Japanese pop singer Kyary Pamyu Pamyu. The single is Halloween themed, and was released October 17, 2012. The song was used in commercials for G.u. Kyary re-released the single through Sire Records in the United States on April 30, 2013.

Track listing

Charts

Personnel
Credits adapted from liner notes.
Yasutaka Nakata – written, arranged, produced, recorded, mixed, mastered
Steve Nakamura – art director, designer
Shinji Konishi – hair, make-up
Takeshi Hanzawa – photographer
Kumiko Iijima – stylist
Chihiko Kameyama – prop decorator

References

2012 singles
Songs written by Yasutaka Nakata
Halloween songs
Fiction about fashion
Kyary Pamyu Pamyu songs
Song recordings produced by Yasutaka Nakata
Unborde singles
2012 songs
Japanese songs
J-pop songs
Songs about monsters
Songs about freedom